Mount Norton is a  mountain summit located in the Olympic Mountains in Jefferson County of Washington state. It is situated within Olympic National Park, and is set within the Daniel J. Evans Wilderness. Precipitation runoff from the mountain drains north via the Elwha River and Hayes River. The lower slopes of the mountain are surrounded by forests of Western Red Cedar, Sitka Spruce, Western Hemlock, Alaskan Cedar, Mountain Hemlock, and Douglas-fir.

History

This landform was originally christened "Mount Egan" in 1890 by the 1889-90 Seattle Press Expedition, for John G. Egan (1857–1913), the editor of the Seattle Press newspaper which sponsored the expedition. The mountain's present name is attributable to G.A. Whitehead of the U.S. Forest Service when he renamed the peak in 1925 for his friend and hunting partner, Ernest Norton. The mountain's name has been officially adopted by the United States Board on Geographic Names. Whitehead also named Mount Mystery and Mount Deception.

The first ascent of the summit was made in 1947 by Pat Cummins.

Climate

Based on the Köppen climate classification, Mount Norton is located in the marine west coast climate zone of western North America. Most weather fronts originate in the Pacific Ocean, and travel east toward the Olympic Mountains. As fronts approach, they are forced upward by the peaks of the Olympic Range, causing them to drop their moisture in the form of rain or snowfall (Orographic lift). As a result, the Olympics experience high precipitation, especially during the winter months. During winter months, weather is usually cloudy, but due to high pressure systems over the Pacific Ocean that intensify during summer months, there is often little or no cloud cover during the summer. The months June through August offer the most favorable weather for viewing or climbing this peak.

See also

 Olympic Mountains
 Geology of the Pacific Northwest

References

External links

 
 Weather forecast: Mount Norton

Olympic Mountains
Mountains of Washington (state)
Mountains of Jefferson County, Washington
Landforms of Olympic National Park
North American 1000 m summits